Francesco Saverio Salerno (August 27, 1928 – January 21, 2017) was a Catholic bishop.

Ordained to the priesthood in 1952, Salerno was named titular bishop of Cerveteri and secretary of the Apostolic Signatura, Italy, in 1997. He served as secretary from 1998 to 2003.

References

1928 births
2017 deaths
20th-century Italian Roman Catholic bishops
Members of the Apostolic Signatura
21st-century Italian Roman Catholic bishops